Somerset is an historic villa in Kinnoull, Perth and Kinross, Scotland. Located on Kinnoull Terrace, it is a Category C listed building, built around 1868. It is one of five listed properties on the street, denoted by Historic Environment Scotland as items of special interest. Several of the properties appear on maps of Perth from the 1860s.

References 

19th-century establishments in Scotland
Listed buildings in Kinnoull, Perth and Kinross
Category C listed buildings in Perth and Kinross